Love Comes Quietly is a 1973 Belgian-Dutch drama film directed by Nikolai van der Heyde. It was entered into the 23rd Berlin International Film Festival. Barbara Hershey won a gold medal at the Atlanta Film Festival for her role in this film.

Plot
An American returns to his native Dutch village and causes a sensation there. When his pregnant stepdaughter starts an affair with the son of the local cheese-factory owner, the conservative village starts to despise her.

Cast
 Sandy van der Linden - Harm-Wouter
 Barbara Hershey - Angela (as Barbara Seagull)
 Ralph Meeker - Ben Hoeksema
 Ward de Ravet - Menno Dijkstra
 Kitty Janssen - Louise Dijkstra
 Onno Molenkamp - Vicar Dominee de Vries (as Onno Tuinman)
 Frans Mulder - Wiebke
 Fanny Winkler - Geesje
 Hanneke Reijnders - Renske de Vries
 Romain DeConinck - Waard Meindersma
 Hero Muller - Krolse knecht
 Roel Nijboer - Norse boer
 Henk O'Breen - Notabele
 Geert Thijssens - Jensen
 Gietema Ype - Notary

Production
When Barbara Hershey agreed to participate in this film, she was six months pregnant and so Nikolai van der Heyde rewrote his screenplay to suit her condition.

References

External links

1973 films
1973 drama films
1970s Dutch-language films
1970s English-language films
Films scored by Georges Delerue
Films directed by Nikolai van der Heyde
1973 multilingual films
Belgian multilingual films
Dutch multilingual films